Wapta Mountain is a mountain located in the Canadian Rockies between Emerald Lake and Yoho Valley in Yoho National Park, British Columbia, Canada. It stands just north of the ridge containing the Burgess Shale fossil beds. Along with The Vice President and Mount Burgess, Wapta Mountain forms the backdrop to Emerald Lake, and marks the southern end of the President Range.

In 1901, James Outram, J. H. Scattergood, and their guide C. Bohren, became the first people to ascend Wapta Mountain. Wapta Mountain overlooks Takakkaw Falls (1,247 feet), the second tallest waterfall in western Canada. The word "Wapta" means "river" in the Stoney language.

References 

Two-thousanders of British Columbia
Mountains of Yoho National Park
Canadian Rockies
Kootenay Land District